The 1985–86 NBA season was the Warriors' 40th season in the NBA and 23rd in the San Francisco Bay Area.

Draft picks

Roster

Regular season
 On Wednesday, January 15, 1986, the Warriors scored 150 points in a 150-104 regulation victory over the Utah Jazz.  None of Golden State's starters played in the fourth quarter.  Eight Golden State players scored in double figures.

Season standings

z - clinched division title
y - clinched division title
x - clinched playoff spot

Record vs. opponents

Game log

Player statistics

Season

Awards and records

Transactions

References

See also
 1985-86 NBA season

Golden State Warriors seasons
Golden State
Golden
Golden